Nadiad is one of the 182 Legislative Assembly constituencies of Gujarat state in India. It is part of Kheda district.

List of segments

This assembly seat represents the following segments,

 Nadiad Taluka (Part) Villages – Tundel, Dumral, Piplag, Uttarsanda, Bhumel, Narsanda, Gutal, Keriavi, Piplata, Akhdol, Valetva, Vadtal, Rajnagar, Kanjari, Nadiad (M)

Members of Legislative Assembly

1972 -  Babubhai Desai, Indian National Congress 
1975 - Dinsha Patel, Indian National Congress (Organisation)
1980 - Dinsha Patel, Janata Party
1985 - Dinsha Patel, Janata Party
1990 - Dinsha Patel, Janata Dal
1995 - Dinsha Patel, Indian National Congress
1998 - Pankajkumar Desai, Bharatiya Janata Party
2002 - Pankajkumar Desai, Bharatiya Janata Party
2007 - Pankajkumar Desai, Bharatiya Janata Party
2012 - Pankajkumar Desai, Bharatiya Janata Party

Election results

2022

2017

2012

See also
 List of constituencies of Gujarat Legislative Assembly
 Gujarat Legislative Assembly

References

External links
 

Assembly constituencies of Gujarat
Kheda district